On 22 July 2015 at 7:43 AM, a passenger train on its way from Bohumín to Františkovy Lázně collided with a truck on a rail crossing in Studénka, Czech Republic. Three passengers died and seventeen others were injured. It was the deadliest train disaster in the Czech Republic since 2008, when a road bridge under construction collapsed just in front of an approaching train on the same track, two kilometres ahead of the 2015 crash site.

Incident
On 22 July 2015, a truck driver of Polish nationality was driving from Poland to Hungary with a load of aluminium plates. The driver chose a time-consuming route on local roads in order to save money on highway tolls. The driver drove through a rail crossing near the Studénka train station. The crossing was protected by warning signals and gates, and the driver entered the crossing when the red lights accompanied by acoustic signal. The driver drove into the crossing despite warnings and as the gates went down, he stopped the truck on the tracks. Instead of ramming through the gate, which is constructed so as to allow even a motorbike to penetrate the barrier and automatically sends a stop signal to all approaching trains if breached, the driver moved the truck only a few metres forward in order to avoid a direct impact to its cab, with its trailer carrying aluminium sheets remaining on the track.

The trailer, as it was pushed by the train, inflicted major damage to the station platform, with projectile debris injuring six people at the station. Two passengers sitting in the front carriage were killed instantly, while the train driver lost his leg and sustained further serious injuries, including to his spine, as more than three tons of metal sheets smashed through the driver's cabin and into the passenger compartment. Another twelve people were injured inside the train, one of them fatally.

Aftermath
The truck driver, completely unharmed in the crash, was detained by Czech police. He was charged with public endangerment, which carries a penalty of five to ten years' imprisonment, and ordered into pre-trial custody by the court.

In February 2016 the County Court in Nový Jičín sentenced the driver to  years in prison, and banned him from driving on Czech territory until 2026.

References

See also
 List of level crossing crashes

2015 in the Czech Republic 
Accidents and incidents involving České dráhy
Level crossing incidents in Europe
Railway accidents and incidents in the Czech Republic
Railway accidents in 2015
2015 disasters in the Czech Republic